Fib may refer to:

Places
 Kingdom of Fib, now Fife, Scotland

Arts, entertainment, and media
 Fib (poetry), a form of poetry
 Festival Internacional de Benicàssim, a Spanish music festival
 Folket i Bild, a Swedish news magazine

Enterprises
 First International Bank (Liberia)
 First Investment Bank, a Bulgarian bank

Medicine 
 Fascia iliaca block
 Fibrillarin
 Fibrillation
 Fibrinogen
 Fibula

Science and technology
 FiB index, or Fisheries in Balance index
 Flying inflatable boat
 Focused ion beam
 Forwarding information base
Fluoride-ion Battery

Sport
 Federation of International Bandy
 Fédération Internationale de Boules, the highest international authority of bocce sport

Other uses 
 Fib (lie), a form of bending the truth  that is usually forgiven because it is not intended to deceive
 Barcelona School of Informatics
 Fires brigade, of the United States Army
 International Federation for Structural Concrete
 United Nations Force Intervention Brigade
 Federal Investigation Bureau, in Government Emergency, Law enforcement agencies and Intelligence agencies, Video games series Grand Theft Auto, computer game
 Friendly Illinois Buddy, an exonym used by Wisconsinites to refer to Illinoisans